Jonathan Alejandro Herrera Rodriguez (born November 13, 1984) is a Venezuelan former professional baseball infielder. He played in Major League Baseball (MLB) for the Colorado Rockies, Boston Red Sox and Chicago Cubs.

Career

Colorado Rockies
Herrera was signed as an undrafted free agent by the Colorado Rockies on April 6, 2002.

On April 29, 2008, Herrera was called up to the major leagues to play second base for the Colorado Rockies in response to an injury sustained by their star shortstop Troy Tulowitzki as well as other lineup difficulties plaguing the team in the early 2008 baseball season. On May 4, he got his first RBI in a start against the Los Angeles Dodgers at Coors Field.

On December 12, 2008, Herrera was non-tendered, but re-signed to a minor league deal the next day.

Herrera was called up again on May 31, 2010, to the Rockies from the Colorado Springs Sky Sox.  After returning to Triple-A, he was recalled on August 19.

Boston Red Sox
On December 18, 2013, Herrera was traded to the Boston Red Sox for pitcher Franklin Morales and minor-league pitcher Chris Martin. After batting .233 in 42 games for the Red Sox in 2014, he underwent elbow surgery. The Red Sox outrighted Herrera to the minor leagues after the season, but he rejected the assignment and became a free agent.

Chicago Cubs
Herrera signed with the Chicago Cubs in December 2014. On April 5, 2015, Herrera had his contract selected to the major leagues. On October 29, 2015, Herrera elected free agency.

Rojos del Águila de Veracruz
On May 11, 2016, Herrera signed with the Rojos del Águila de Veracruz of the Mexican Baseball League. He became a free agent after the season.

Olmecas de Tabasco
On January 27, 2017, Herrera signed with the Olmecas de Tabasco of the Mexican League. He was released on April 11, 2017.

See also
 List of Major League Baseball players from Venezuela

References

External links

, or Retrosheet
Pelota Binaria (Venezuelan Winter League)

1984 births
Living people
Águilas del Zulia players
Asheville Tourists players
Baseball players suspended for drug offenses
Boston Red Sox players
Bravos de Margarita players
Caribes de Anzoátegui players
Caribes de Oriente players
Casper Rockies players
Chicago Cubs players
Colorado Rockies players
Colorado Springs Sky Sox players
Major League Baseball players from Venezuela
Major League Baseball second basemen
Mexican League baseball shortstops
Modesto Nuts players
Navegantes del Magallanes players
Pawtucket Red Sox players
Rojos del Águila de Veracruz players
Sportspeople from Maracaibo
Tulsa Drillers players
Venezuelan expatriate baseball players in Mexico
Venezuelan expatriate baseball players in the United States